Mariana Alejandra Pion Núñez (born 19 December 1992) is a Uruguayan professional footballer who plays as a midfielder for Paraguayan Women's Championship club Libertad/Limpeño and the Uruguay women's national team.

Club career
Pion played in Uruguay for Nacional, Colón and River Plate.

International career
Pion represented Uruguay at the 2012 South American U-20 Women's Championship. At senior level, she played two Copa América Femenina editions (2010 and 2014).

International goals
Scores and results list Uruguay's goal tally first

References 

1992 births
Living people
People from San José de Mayo
Uruguayan women's footballers
Women's association football midfielders
Club Nacional de Football players
Colón F.C. players
Club Atlético River Plate (Montevideo) players
Atlético Nacional (women) players
Grêmio Osasco Audax Esporte Clube players
Campeonato Brasileiro de Futebol Feminino Série A1 players
Uruguay women's international footballers
Uruguayan expatriate women's footballers
Uruguayan expatriate sportspeople in Paraguay
Expatriate women's footballers in Paraguay
Uruguayan expatriate sportspeople in Colombia
Expatriate women's footballers in Colombia
Uruguayan expatriate sportspeople in Brazil
Expatriate women's footballers in Brazil